Camilla Filicchi (1771-1848) was an Italian woman painter, active in her native Gubbio.

Biography
She had initial training in Gubbio with Giuseppe Reposati, but later with Annibale Beni. She painted a number of oil canvases for churches in the city, including an Ecstasy of St Francis for the Basilica di Sant'Ubaldo; and Annunciation for the church of San Giovanni Battista.

The late 19th-century biographer, historian of Gubio, Oderigi Lucarelli, dismisses her work with perhaps excessive misogyny, stating:
having applied herself to art only as a digression; her paintings, very warm in colour, are defective in perspective and in drawing. Elsewhere we will mention her best works, none of which, however, even rises to be mediocre.

It is not clear if she is related to Amabilia Filicchi, who lived in Livorno, and painted Elizabeth Ann Seton.

References

19th-century Italian painters
Italian women painters
Umbrian painters
1771 births
1848 deaths